John Skene may refer to:

 John Skene (New Jersey official), Deputy Governor of the West Jersey colony
 John Skene, Lord Curriehill (c.1543–1617), Scottish prosecutor, ambassador, and judge who prosecuted witches